Milton Bruce "Milt" Ottey (born December 29, 1959 in May Pen, Clarendon, Jamaica) is a retired Canadian high jumper. Ottey came to Canada at the age of 10 years. He attended and graduated from high school in the Toronto District School Board (TDSB). He received a full athletic scholarship from the University of Texas at El Paso (UTEP), where he received his bachelor's degree in education. After retiring from active competition, Ottey spent several years coaching at various universities throughout the United States, including University of Texas at El Paso, Kent State University and University of New Mexico before moving back to Toronto, Ontario. 
 
The number one ranked high jumper in the world in 1982 and the twenty three times indoor and outdoor national champion in the men's high jump event, Ottey is the owner and director OT Fitness Educational Services, inc. Ottey took over the reins of the UK kids core skills development program International Fun and Team Athletics (IFTA) in Canada. OT Fitness provide programs in schools that promote health and fitness to assist in the core skills development of children and teens. OT Fitness looks at the obstacles to a healthy lifestyle and helps kids jump over them, crawl under them, run around them and tackle them head on. Ottey resides in Scarbough with his wife and three children. He is a cousin of nine-time Olympic medallist Merlene Ottey.

Achievements
 7-Time Canadian National High Jump Champion (1981–84, 1986–88)
 Won the NCAA & US National titles in 1982.

1Representing the Americas

Note: Results with a q, indicate overall position in qualifying round.

References

External links
 
 
 
 
 
 

1959 births
Living people
People from Clarendon Parish, Jamaica
Canadian male high jumpers
Canadian sportspeople of Jamaican descent
Black Canadian track and field athletes
Jamaican emigrants to Canada
20th-century Canadian people
21st-century Canadian people
Athletes (track and field) at the 1979 Pan American Games
Athletes (track and field) at the 1982 Commonwealth Games
Athletes (track and field) at the 1984 Summer Olympics
Athletes (track and field) at the 1986 Commonwealth Games
Athletes (track and field) at the 1988 Summer Olympics
Athletes (track and field) at the 1990 Commonwealth Games
Commonwealth Games bronze medallists for Canada
Commonwealth Games gold medallists for Canada
Commonwealth Games medallists in athletics
Kent State Golden Flashes coaches
Medalists at the 1979 Pan American Games
Olympic track and field athletes of Canada
Pan American Games bronze medalists for Canada
Pan American Games medalists in athletics (track and field)
UTEP Miners men's track and field athletes
UTEP Miners track and field coaches
World Athletics Championships athletes for Canada
Medallists at the 1982 Commonwealth Games
Medallists at the 1986 Commonwealth Games
Medallists at the 1990 Commonwealth Games